Butterfly Nebula may refer to:

 Planetary Nebula M2-9
 NGC 6302, a bipolar planetary nebula in the constellation Scorpius
 NGC 2346
 Little Dumbbell Nebula
 Sadr Region